William B. Jacko was a state legislator in Arkansas. He served two terms in the Arkansas House of Representatives beginning in 1885.

He, Ed Glover, and S. H. Scott represented Jefferson County, Arkansas. He was re-elected to the 1887 term and served with Ed Jefferson and H. B. Burton.

In a composite photograph of legislators he is documented as a native of Arkansas, a teacher, Republican, Methodist, and from Jefferson Springs.

See also
African-American officeholders during and following the Reconstruction era

References

Republican Party members of the Arkansas House of Representatives
Methodists from Arkansas
Year of birth missing
Schoolteachers from Arkansas
County officials in Arkansas
19th-century American educators
19th-century American politicians
African-American schoolteachers
Politicians from Jefferson County, Arkansas
19th-century African-American politicians
African-American state legislators in Arkansas
African-American Methodists